Miles Boykin (born October 12, 1996) is an American football wide receiver for the Pittsburgh Steelers of the National Football League (NFL). He played college football at Notre Dame.

Early years
Boykin grew up in Tinley Park, Illinois where he played little league football for the Tinley Park Bulldogs organization. Boykin attended Providence Catholic High School in New Lenox, Illinois. He committed to the University of Notre Dame to play college football.

College career
After redshirting his first year at Notre Dame in 2015, Boykin played in 12 games in 2016 and had six receptions for 81 yards and a touchdown. As a sophomore in 2017, he had 12 receptions for 253 yards and two touchdowns. He was named the MVP of the 2018 Citrus Bowl after recording three receptions for 102 yards and the game-winning touchdown. As a junior in 2018, Boykin had 59 receptions for 872 yards and eight touchdowns. After the season, he entered the 2019 NFL Draft.

Professional career

Baltimore Ravens
Boykin was drafted by the Baltimore Ravens in the third round (93rd overall) of the 2019 NFL Draft. He caught a touchdown pass in his NFL debut in the Ravens' 2019 season opener against the Miami Dolphins. He recorded a career-high three receptions and his second touchdown in Week 4 against the Cleveland Browns. He recorded a career-high 55 yards including a 50-yard catch in Week 7 against the Seattle Seahawks. He recorded his third touchdown against the New York Jets in Week 15.

Boykin was placed on the reserve/COVID-19 list by the team on December 16, 2020, and activated three days later.

On September 1, 2021, Boykin was placed on injured reserve to start the season with a hamstring injury.
On September 29, 2021, Boykin was activated to the active roster.

On April 18, 2022, the Ravens released Boykin.

Pittsburgh Steelers
On April 19, 2022, the Pittsburgh Steelers claimed Boykin off of waivers.

References

External links
Baltimore Ravens bio
Notre Dame Fighting Irish bio

1996 births
Living people
People from Tinley Park, Illinois
Players of American football from Illinois
Sportspeople from the Chicago metropolitan area
Sportspeople from Cook County, Illinois
American football wide receivers
Notre Dame Fighting Irish football players
Baltimore Ravens players
Pittsburgh Steelers players